Galindez Island is an island  long, lying immediately east of Winter Island in the Argentine Islands, Wilhelm Archipelago. It was discovered by the French Antarctic Expedition, 1903–05, under Jean-Baptiste Charcot, who named it for Commander Ismael Galindez of the Argentine Navy, who was dispatched in the Uruguay to search for Charcot, when the expedition was feared lost early in 1905. The island was recharted by the British Graham Land Expedition (BGLE) under John Riddoch Rymill, 1934–37.

The BGLE hut on Winter Island disappeared in mysterious circumstances (possibly due to a tsunami) in 1946. A new hut was set up on 7 January 1947 by the Falkland Islands Dependencies Survey (FIDS), becoming known officially as Station F ("Wordie Hut", after James Wordie). This was replaced on 30 May 1954 by a larger hut on nearby Galindez Island ("Coronation Hut" after the coronation of Queen Elizabeth II in 1953) and was a key observatory during the International Geophysical Year 1957/58. FIDS was re-organised and renamed as the British Antarctic Survey (BAS) in the early 1960s. After 30-odd years of continuous occupation as a geophysical, magnetic, ionospheric, atmospheric and meteorological observatory, Station F was rebuilt by BAS in 1980, before being abandoned and handed over to Ukraine on 6 February 1996 and renamed Vernadsky Research Base. 
The Ukrainian Vernadsky Research Base is at Marina Point on Galindez Island.

Galindez Island is also the home to Woozle Hill.

See also 
 List of Antarctic and sub-Antarctic islands
 Stella Creek

References

Islands of the Wilhelm Archipelago